Anthony Shadid (September 26, 1968 – February 16, 2012) was a foreign correspondent for The New York Times based in Baghdad and Beirut who won the Pulitzer Prize for International Reporting twice, in 2004 and 2010.

Background

Anthony Shadid was born on September 26, 1968, in Oklahoma City, Oklahoma, of Lebanese Christian descent.  In 1990, he graduated from the University of Wisconsin–Madison, where he wrote for The Daily Cardinal student newspaper.

Career
From 2003 to 2009 Shadid was a staff writer for The Washington Post where he was an Islamic affairs correspondent based in the Middle East. He previously worked as Middle East correspondent for the Associated Press based in Cairo and as news editor of the AP bureau in Los Angeles. He spent two years covering diplomacy and the State Department for The Boston Globe before joining the Posts foreign desk.

In 2002, he was shot in the shoulder by an Israel sniper in Ramallah while reporting for the Boston Globe in the West Bank. The bullet also grazed his spine.

On March 16, 2011, Shadid and three colleagues were reported missing in Eastern Libya, having gone there to report on the uprising against the dictatorship of Col. Muammar Al-Ghaddafi. On March 18, 2011, The New York Times reported that Libya agreed to free him and three colleagues: Stephen Farrell, Lynsey Addario and Tyler Hicks. The Libyan government released the four journalists on March 21, 2011.

Personal life and death
Shadid married Nada Bakri, also a reporter for The New York Times; they had a son, Malik.  Shadid had a daughter, Laila, from his first marriage.

Michael Shadid was his great uncle.

Shadid died at age 43 on February 16, 2012, from a "fatal asthma attack" while attempting to leave Syria. Shadid's smoking and extreme allergy to horses are believed to be the major contributing factors in causing his fatal asthma attack. His body was carried to Turkey by Tyler Hicks, a photographer for The New York Times.

Shadid's cousin, Dr. Edward Shadid of Oklahoma City, challenged the Times version of the death, and instead blamed the publication for forcing him into Syria.

Awards
 2003:  George Polk Award for Foreign Reporting
 2004:  
 Michael Kelly Award
 Overseas Press Club award
 American Society of Newspaper Editors award
 Pulitzer Prize for International Reporting (2004)
 2006:  Ridenhour Book Prize for Night Draws Near
 2010:  Pulitzer Prize for International Reporting (2010) 
 2011: Honorary Doctorate of Humane Letters from the American University of Beirut 
 2012:  
 George Polk Award for Foreign Reporting
 Finalist for National Book Award (Nonfiction) and National Book Critics Circle Award (Autobiography) for House of Stone

Works

Shadid's experiences in Iraq formed the subject for his 2005 book Night Draws Near, an empathetic look at how the war has impacted the Iraqi people beyond liberation and insurgency.

 Legacy of the Prophet: Despots, Democrats, and the New Politics of Islam (Westview Press, 2002)
 Night Draws Near: Iraq's People in the Shadow of America's War (New York: Henry Holt and Company, 2005)
 Dove la notte non finisce (Piemme, 2006)
 House of Stone (New York:  Houghton Mifflin Harcourt, 2012)

Award for Journalism Ethics

References

External links

Pulitzer Prize winning work at The Washington Post
Anthony Shadid 1968–2012, pieces written for the Associated Press

Pulitzer Prize for International Reporting in 2004 and 2010 – citation, works, biography, jury
David Chambers, "Calling Helen Thomas", Saudi Aramco World, March/April 2006 – feature article profiling Anthony Shadid, Newsweek'''s Lorraine Ali and NBC's Hoda Kotb
Amy Goodman, Anthony Shadid: Tunisia Has "Electrified People Across the Arab World", Democracy Now!, January 18, 2011 – video report 
Terry Gross, "A Foreign Correspondent Reflects On The Arab Spring", Fresh Air'', December 21, 2011 – interview with Anthony Shadid

1968 births
2012 deaths
Writers from Oklahoma City
The Boston Globe people
The Washington Post people
American war correspondents
Pulitzer Prize for International Reporting winners
American people of Lebanese descent
University of Wisconsin–Madison alumni
American male journalists
The New York Times writers
Deaths from asthma
War correspondents of the Syrian civil war
University of Wisconsin–Madison School of Journalism & Mass Communication alumni